is a Japanese politician of the Democratic Party of Japan, a member of the House of Councillors in the Diet (national legislature). A native of Nakano, Tokyo and high school graduate, he was elected to the House of Councillors for the first time in 2004.

References

External links 
  in Japanese.

Members of the House of Councillors (Japan)
Living people
1947 births
Democratic Party of Japan politicians